Jessica Diggins (born August 26, 1991) is an American cross-country skier. She and teammate Kikkan Randall won the United States' first-ever cross-country skiing gold medal at the Winter Olympics in the team sprint in 2018. At the 2022 Winter Olympics, Diggins won the silver medal in the 30 kilometer freestyle and the bronze medal in the individual sprint, making her the most decorated American cross-country skier of all time. She also won four medals at the FIS Nordic World Ski Championships from 2013 to 2017. In 2021, Diggins clinched the top spot in the women's overall standings for the 2020–21 FIS Cross-Country World Cup, becoming the first American to do so.

Early life
Diggins was born in Saint Paul, Minnesota and grew up in Afton, Minnesota. She has one sister, Mackenzie. Diggins began skiing at age 4. She showed prowess for skiing at age 11 when she started competing against older children. Diggins graduated from Stillwater Area High School in 2010.

Athletic career

High school and juniors
Diggins competed for the Stillwater Area High School, cross-country ski team. In 2008, Diggins was the top-ranked girls' individual cross-country skier in the Minnesota high school rankings. She fell out of the state rankings in 2009 when she competed and won the United States Junior National Sprint title on March 9 of that year. She was added to the United States World Junior Cross-Country Ski Team in 2010.

Professional

Diggins earned an academic scholarship to Northern Michigan University but deferred enrollment to race with the Central Cross-Country Elite team for one year. She decided to race professionally rather than attend college. She was named to the United States Ski Team in 2011 and competed at her first World Championships that year. Diggins won a gold medal with Kikkan Randall in the team sprint in the 2013 FIS Nordic World Ski Championships in Val di Fiemme. At the 2014 U23 World Championships, Diggins won silver in the individual sprint.

Diggins was named to the U.S. team for the 2014 Winter Olympics. In her first event, the 15 kilometer skiathlon, she placed 8th (out of 61 competitors) with a time of 40:05.5.

Diggins won the silver medal in the 10-kilometer freestyle race in the 2015 FIS Nordic World Ski Championships in Falun. In the 2015–2016 World Cup, she placed 8th in the overall and sprint rankings and 9th in the distance ranking.

At the 2017 Nordic World Ski Championships in Lahti, Finland, Diggins took two medals: in the freestyle sprint, she won her quarterfinal and semifinal heats on her way to taking the silver, ahead of teammate Randall in third. Subsequently, in the classic team sprint, Diggins and Sadie Bjornsen finished third, catching and passing the Swedish team in the closing stages of the race to take the bronze by 0.19 seconds. This made Diggins the first American to win four World Championship medals in cross-country skiing.

Diggins finished third overall in the 2017–18 Tour de Ski, becoming the first American to finish on the podium in the overall classification, and beating her previous best of fifth overall in the previous edition. Her teammate Sadie Bjornsen finished ninth overall, also making it the first time that two Americans finished in the overall top ten. Diggins finished second overall in the World Cup 2017–2018 season standings.

At the 2018 Winter Olympics in Pyeongchang, South Korea, Diggins and Randall became the first American cross-country skiers to capture a gold medal by winning the women's team sprint at the Alpensia Cross-Country Centre. In the final sprint, Diggins passed the last two individual sprint classical gold medalists – Sochi gold medalist Maiken Caspersen Falla of Norway before the last turn and then Pyeongchang gold medalist Stina Nilsson of Sweden on the last straightaway. Theirs was not only the United States' first ever cross-country skiing gold medal but also the first American cross-country skiing medal since Bill Koch won silver in the men's 30 km in 1976. Steve Schlanger and Chad Salmela called the end of the race for NBC:

Diggins competed in all six women's cross-country skiing events at the Olympics and finished in the top 10 in all of them. At the end of the games, she was the flag bearer for the United States in the closing ceremony.

Diggins won the 2021 Tour de Ski, a first for an American. She placed atop the overall World Cup 2020–2021 season standings, claiming the biggest annual prize in cross-country skiing. Diggins' victory put her with Koch, who won the men's title in 1982, to be the only Americans to win overall season titles for a World Cup cross-country ski circuit.

At the 2022 Winter Olympics, Diggins won bronze in the women's sprint to become the first American to win an individual Olympic medal in a cross-country sprint. She went on to win silver in the women's 30 kilometer freestyle, earning the U.S.' last medal on the last day of the Olympics. She was the first non-European to win a medal in the event. Diggins left Beijing as the most decorated American cross-country skier of all time. For the second straight Olympics, she finished in the top 10 in all six women's cross-country skiing events.

In December 2022, Diggins broke the American record for World Cup cross-country ski wins with her fourteenth such win. 

At the FIS Nordic World Ski Championships 2023 in Slovenia, Diggins and teammate Julie Kern won bronze in the team sprint. Two days later, Diggins won gold in the 10km freestyle, which was the first top medal for an American in an individual event at any cross-country skiing world championship.

Social activism

Diggins is an ambassador for the non-profit organization Fast and Female, which inspires girls ages 8–18 to be active and empowered in sports. Diggins is also an ambassador for the non-profit organization Protect Our Winters (POW), whose aim is to effect systemic solutions to climate change through the outdoor sports community. Diggins traveled with POW to Capitol Hill in April 2018 to raise concerns over climate change.

In 2019, Diggins became a spokesperson for the Emily Program, an organization in the United States that provides treatment for eating disorders. In several interviews and essays, she revealed her experience of seeking treatment for bulimia at the organization in 2010, with the aim of her story to improve self-acceptance and reduce stigma and secrecy around eating disorders. In 2020, Diggins wrote an autobiography, Brave Enough, about her athletic accomplishments and personal struggles with bulimia as a teenager.

Cross-country skiing results

Olympic Games
 3 medals – (1 gold, 1 silver, 1 bronze)

World Championships
6 medals – (2 gold, 2 silver, 2 bronze)

World Cup

Season titles
 2 titles – (1 overall, 1 distance)

Season standings

Individual podiums
14 victories – (6 , 8 ) 
47 podiums – (25 , 22 ) 
{| class="wikitable sortable" style="font-size:95%; text-align:center; border:grey solid 1px; border-collapse:collapse; background:#ffffff;"
|- style="background:#efefef;"
! style="background-color:#369; color:white;"| No.
! style="background-color:#369; color:white;"| Season
! style="background-color:#4180be; color:white; width:100px;"| Date
! style="background-color:#4180be; color:white; width:185px;"| Location
! style="background-color:#4180be; color:white; width:170px;"| Race
! style="background-color:#4180be; color:white; width:100px;"| Level
! style="background-color:#4180be; color:white;| Place
|-
| align=center|1 ||rowspan=5 align=center|2015–16|| bgcolor="#BOEOE6" align= right | 8 January 2016 || align=left|  Toblach, Italy || bgcolor="#BOEOE6"| 5 km Individual F || bgcolor="#BOEOE6"| Stage World Cup || bgcolor="#BOEOE6" | 1st
|-
| align=center|2 || align= right | 23 January 2016 || align=left|  Nové Město, Czech Republic || 10 km Individual F || World Cup || 3rd
|-
| align=center|3 || align= right | 20 February 2016 || align=left|  Lahti, Finland || 1.6 km Sprint F || World Cup || 2nd
|-
| align=center|4 || align= right | 1 March 2016 || align=left|  Gatineau, Canada || 1.7 km Sprint F || Stage World Cup || 3rd
|-
| align=center|5 || align= right | 12 March 2016 || align= left|  Canmore, Canada || 10 km Pursuit C || Stage World Cup || 3rd
|-
| align=center|6 ||rowspan=3 align=center|2016–17|| bgcolor="#BOEOE6" align= right | 3 December 2016 || align=left|  Lillehammer, Norway || bgcolor="#BOEOE6"| 5 km Individual F || bgcolor="#BOEOE6"| Stage World Cup || bgcolor="#BOEOE6"|1st
|-
| align=center|7 || align= right | 3 January 2017 || align=left|  Oberstdorf, Germany || 5 km + 5 km Skiathlon C/F || Stage World Cup || 2nd
|-
| align=center|8 || bgcolor="#BOEOE6" align= right | 6 January 2017 || align=left|  Toblach, Italy || bgcolor="#BOEOE6"| 5 km Individual F || bgcolor="#BOEOE6"| Stage World Cup || bgcolor="#BOEOE6"|1st
|-
| align=center|9 ||rowspan=8 align=center|2017–18|| align= right | 1 January 2018 || align=left|  Lenzerheide, Switzerland || 10 km Pursuit F || Stage World Cup || 3rd
|-
| align=center|10 || align= right | 7 January 2018 || align=left|  Val di Fiemme, Italy || 9 km Pursuit F || Stage World Cup || 3rd
|-
| align=center|11 || align=right| 30 December 2017– 7 January 2018 || align=left|  Tour de Ski || Overall Standings || World Cup || 3rd
|-
| align=center|12 || bgcolor="#BOEOE6" align= right | 28 January 2018 || align=left|  Seefeld, Austria || bgcolor="#BOEOE6"| 10 km Mass Start F || bgcolor="#BOEOE6"| World Cup || bgcolor="#BOEOE6"|1st
|-
| align=center|13 || align= right | 7 March 2018 || align=left|  Drammen, Norway || 1.2 km Sprint C || World Cup || 3rd
|-
| align=center|14 || align= right | 11 March 2018 || align=left|  Oslo, Norway || 30 km Mass Start F || World Cup || 2nd
|-
| align=center|15 || bgcolor="#BOEOE6" align= right | 18 March 2018 || align=left|  Falun, Sweden || bgcolor="#BOEOE6"| 10 km Pursuit F || bgcolor="#BOEOE6"| Stage World Cup || bgcolor="#BOEOE6"|1st
|-
| align=center|16 || align= right | 16–18 March 2018 || align=left|  World Cup Final || Overall Standings|| World Cup || 2nd
|-
| align=center|17 ||rowspan=5 align=center|2018–19||  align= right | 29 December 2018 || align=left|  Toblach, Italy ||  1.3 km Sprint F||  Stage World Cup || 3rd
|-
| align=center|18 || align= right | 1 January 2019 || align=left|  Val Müstair, Switzerland || 1.4 km Sprint F || Stage World Cup || 3rd
|-
| align=center|19 || align= right | 3 January 2019 || align=left|  Oberstdorf, Germany || 10 km Pursuit F|| Stage World Cup || 3rd
|-
| align=center|20 || bgcolor="#BOEOE6" align= right | 16 February 2019 || align=left|  Cogne, Italy || bgcolor="#BOEOE6"| 1.6 km Sprint F || bgcolor="#BOEOE6"| World Cup || bgcolor="#BOEOE6"|1st
|-
| align=center|21 || align=right | 17 March 2019 || align=left|  Falun, Sweden || 10 km Individual F|| World Cup || 3rd
|-
| align=center|22 ||rowspan=5 align=center|2019–20||  align= right | 1 December 2019 || align=left|  Rukatunturi, Finland ||  10 km Pursuit F ||  Stage World Cup || 3rd
|-
| align=center|23 || align=right | 7 December 2019 || align=left|  Lillehammer, Norway ||  7.5 km + 7.5 km Skiathlon C/F || World Cup || 2nd
|-
| align=center |24 || align=right | 15 December 2019 || align=left | Davos, Switzerland || 10 km Individual F || World Cup || 3rd
|-
| align=center |25 || align=right | 4 January 2020 || align=left | Val di Fiemme, Italy || 1.3 km Sprint C || Stage World Cup || 3rd
|-
| align=center |26 || align=right | 26 January 2020 || align=left | Oberstdorf, Germany || 1.5 km Sprint C || World Cup || 3rd
|-
| align=center|27 || rowspan=9 align=center|2020–21|| align=right| 1 January 2021 || rowspan=3 align=left|  Val Müstair, Switzerland || 1.4 km Sprint F || Stage World Cup || 3rd
|-
| align=center|28 || align=right| 2 January 2021 || 10 km Mass Start C || Stage World Cup || 3rd
|-
| align=center|29 || bgcolor="#BOEOE6" align= right | 3 January 2021 || bgcolor="#BOEOE6"| 10 km Pursuit F || bgcolor="#BOEOE6"| Stage World Cup || bgcolor="#BOEOE6"|1st
|-
| align=center|30 || bgcolor="#BOEOE6" align= right | 5 January 2021 || rowspan=2 align=left | Toblach, Italy || bgcolor="#BOEOE6"| 10 km Individual F || bgcolor="#BOEOE6"| Stage World Cup || bgcolor="#BOEOE6"|1st
|-
| align=center|31 || align=right| 6 January 2021 || 10 km Pursuit C || Stage World Cup || 3rd
|-
| align=center|32 || align=right| 9 January 2021 || align=left | Val di Fiemme, Italy || 10 km Mass Start F || Stage World Cup || 2nd
|-
| align=center|33 || align=right bgcolor="#BOEOE6"| 1–10 January 2021 || align=left|  Tour de Ski || bgcolor="#BOEOE6"| Overall Standings || bgcolor="#BOEOE6"| World Cup || bgcolor="#BOEOE6"|1st
|-
| align=center|34 || align=right bgcolor="#BOEOE6"| 29 January 2021 || align=left | Falun, Sweden || bgcolor="#BOEOE6"|10 km Individual F || bgcolor="#BOEOE6"|World Cup || bgcolor="#BOEOE6"|1st
|-
| align=center|35 || align=right | 6 February 2021 || align=left | Ulricehamn, Sweden || 1.3 km Sprint F || World Cup || 3rd
|-
| align=center|36 ||rowspan=5 align=center|2021–22|| align= right | 3 December 2021 || align=left|  Lillehammer, Norway || 1.6 km Sprint F || World Cup || 2nd
|-
| align=center|37 || align=right| 12 December 2021|| align=left|  Davos, Switzerland || 10 km Individual F ||  World Cup || 2nd
|-
| align=center|38 || align=right bgcolor="#BOEOE6"| 28 December 2021 || align=left |  Lenzerheide, Switzerland|| bgcolor="#BOEOE6"|1.5 km Sprint F || bgcolor="#BOEOE6"|Stage World Cup || bgcolor="#BOEOE6"|1st
|-
| align=center|39 || align=right bgcolor="#BOEOE6"| 31 December 2021 || align=left |  Oberstdorf, Germany|| bgcolor="#BOEOE6"|10 km Mass Start F || bgcolor="#BOEOE6"|Stage World Cup || bgcolor="#BOEOE6"|1st
|-
| align=center|40 || align=right| 12 March 2022|| align=left|  Falun, Sweden || 10 km Individual F || World Cup || 3rd
|-
| align=center|41 ||rowspan=7 align=center|2022–23|| align=right bgcolor="#BOEOE6"| 2 December 2022 || align=left|  Lillehammer, Norway || bgcolor="#BOEOE6"|10 km Individual F || bgcolor="#BOEOE6"|World Cup || bgcolor="#BOEOE6"|1st
|-
| align=center|42 || align=right| 17 December 2022||rowspan=2 align=left|  Davos, Switzerland || 1.5 km Sprint F || World Cup || 2nd
|-
| align=center|43 || bgcolor="#BOEOE6" align= right | 18 December 2022|| bgcolor="#BOEOE6"| 20 km Individual F || bgcolor="#BOEOE6"| World Cup || bgcolor="#BOEOE6"|'1st
|-
| align=center|44 || align=right| 27 January 2023|| align=left|  Les Rousses, France || 10 km Individual F || World Cup || 3rd
|-
| align=center|45 || align=right| 3 February 2023|| rowspan=2 align=left|  Toblach, Italy || 1.3 km Sprint F || World Cup || 3rd
|-
| align=center|46 || align=right| 4 February 2023|| 10 km Individual F|| World Cup || 2nd
|-
| align=center|47 || align=right| 12 March 2023 || align=left|  Oslo, Norway || 50 km Mass Start F || World Cup || 3rd
|-
|}

Team podiums
2 victories – (1 , 1 ) 
10 podiums – (7 , 3 ) 

US National Championships medals
2011 –  Rumford, Maine  1st, sprint freestyle
2011 –  Sun Valley, Idaho  3rd, 30 km classic mass start
2012 –  Rumford, Maine  1st, sprint freestyle
2012 –  Rumford, Maine  1st, 10 km freestyle
2012 –  Rumford, Maine  1st, 20 km classic mass start
2012 –  Rumford, Maine  2nd, sprint classic
2012 –  Craftsbury, Vermont  2nd, 30 km freestyle mass start
2016 –  Craftsbury, Vermont  1st, 30 km freestyle mass start
2018 –  Craftsbury, Vermont  1st, 30 km freestyle mass start

Bibliography
 Diggins, Jessie and Smith, Todd (2020). Brave Enough''.

References

External links

 
 NBC Sports, 2018 Winter Olympics: Diggins and Randall win women's cross-country team sprint
 Interview with Jessie Diggins. International Ski Federation, retrieved October 4, 2018

1991 births
Living people
American female cross-country skiers
Cross-country skiers at the 2014 Winter Olympics
Cross-country skiers at the 2018 Winter Olympics
Cross-country skiers at the 2022 Winter Olympics
Olympic gold medalists for the United States in cross-country skiing
Olympic silver medalists for the United States in cross-country skiing
Olympic bronze medalists for the United States in cross-country skiing
Medalists at the 2018 Winter Olympics
Medalists at the 2022 Winter Olympics
FIS Nordic World Ski Championships medalists in cross-country skiing
Tour de Ski winners
People from Washington County, Minnesota
Sportspeople from Saint Paul, Minnesota
Writers from Saint Paul, Minnesota
21st-century American women